Saint Dunstan (c. 909 – 19 May 988) was an English bishop. He was successively Abbot of Glastonbury Abbey, Bishop of Worcester, Bishop of London and Archbishop of Canterbury, later canonised as a saint. His work restored monastic life in England and reformed the English Church. His 11th-century biographer Osbern, himself an artist and scribe, states that Dunstan was skilled in "making a picture and forming letters", as were other clergy of his age who reached senior rank.
Dunstan served as an important minister of state to several English kings. He was the most popular saint in England for nearly two centuries, having gained fame for the many stories of his greatness, not least among which were those concerning his famed cunning in defeating the Devil.

Early life (909–943)

Birth and relatives
According to Dunstan's earliest biographer, known only as 'B',  his parents were called Heorstan and Cynethryth and they lived near Glastonbury. B states that Dunstan "oritur" in the days of King Æthelstan, 924 to 939. "Oritur" has often been taken to mean "born", but this is unlikely as another source states that he was ordained during Æthelstan's reign, and he would have been under the minimum age of 30 if he was born no earlier than 924. It is more likely that "oritur" should be taken as "emerged", and that he was born around 910. B states that he was related to Ælfheah the Bald, the Bishop of Winchester and Cynesige, Bishop of Lichfield. According to a later biographer, Adelard of Ghent, he was a nephew of Athelm, Archbishop of Canterbury, but this is less certain as it is not mentioned by B, who should have known as he had been a member of Dunstan's household.

School to the king's court
As a young boy, Dunstan studied under the Irish monks who then occupied the ruins of Glastonbury Abbey. Accounts tell of his youthful optimism and of his vision of the abbey being restored. While still a boy, Dunstan was stricken with a near-fatal illness and effected a seemingly miraculous recovery. Even as a child, he was noted for his devotion to learning and for his mastery of many kinds of artistic craftsmanship. With his parents' consent he was tonsured, received minor orders and served in the ancient church of St Mary. He became so well known for his devotion to learning that he is said to have been summoned by Athelm to enter his service. He was later appointed to the court of King Athelstan.

Dunstan soon became a favourite of the king and was the envy of other members of the court. A plot was hatched to disgrace him and Dunstan was accused of being involved with witchcraft and black magic. The king ordered him to leave the court and as Dunstan was leaving the palace his enemies physically attacked him, beat him severely, bound him, and threw him into a cesspool. He managed to crawl out and make his way to the house of a friend. From there, he journeyed to Winchester and entered the service of Ælfheah, Bishop of Winchester.

The bishop tried to persuade him to become a monk, but Dunstan was doubtful whether he had a vocation to a celibate life. The answer came in the form of an attack of swelling tumours all over Dunstan's body. This ailment was so severe that it was thought to be leprosy. It was more probably some form of blood poisoning caused by being beaten and thrown in the cesspool. Whatever the cause, it changed Dunstan's mind. He took Holy Orders in 943, in the presence of Ælfheah, and returned to live the life of a hermit at Glastonbury. It was there that Dunstan studied, worked at his art, and played on his harp. It is at this time, according to a late 11th-century legend, that the Devil is said to have tempted Dunstan and to have been held by the face with Dunstan's tongs.

Monk and abbot (943–957)

Life as a monk

Dunstan worked as a silversmith and in the scriptorium while he was living at Glastonbury. It is thought likely that he was the artist who drew the well-known image of Christ with a small kneeling monk beside him in the Glastonbury Classbook, "one of the first of a series of outline drawings which were to become a special feature of Anglo-Saxon art of this period." Dunstan became famous as a musician, illuminator, and metalworker. Lady Æthelflaed, King Æthelstan's niece, made Dunstan a trusted adviser and on her death, she left a considerable fortune to him. He used this money later in life to foster and encourage a monastic revival in England. About the same time, his father Heorstan died and Dunstan inherited his fortune as well. He became a person of great influence, and on the death of King Æthelstan in 940, the new King, Edmund, summoned him to his court at Cheddar and made him a minister.

Again, royal favour fostered jealousy among other courtiers and again Dunstan's enemies succeeded in their plots. The King was prepared to send Dunstan away. There were then at Cheddar certain envoys from the "Eastern Kingdom", which probably meant East Anglia. Dunstan implored the envoys to take him with them when they returned to their homes. They agreed to do so, but it never happened. The story is recorded:

Abbot of Glastonbury
Dunstan, now Abbot of Glastonbury, went to work at once on the task of reform. He had to re-create monastic life and to rebuild the abbey. He began by establishing Benedictine monasticism at Glastonbury. The Rule of St. Benedict was the basis of his restoration according to the author of 'Edgar's Establishment of the Monasteries' (written in the 960s or 970s) and according to Dunstan's first biographer, who had been a member of the community at Glastonbury. Their statements are also in accordance with the nature of his first measures as abbot, with the significance of his first buildings, and with the Benedictine leanings of his most prominent disciples.

Nevertheless, not all the members of Dunstan's community at Glastonbury were monks who followed the Benedictine Rule. In fact, Dunstan's first biographer, 'B.', was a cleric who eventually joined a community of canons at Liège after leaving Glastonbury.

Dunstan's first care was to rebuild the Church of St. Peter, rebuild the cloister, and re-establish the monastic enclosure. The secular affairs of the house were committed to his brother, Wulfric, "so that neither himself nor any of the professed monks might break enclosure." A school for the local youth was founded and soon became the most famous of its time in England. A substantial extension of the irrigation system on the surrounding Somerset Levels was also completed.

Within two years of Dunstan's appointment, in 946, King Edmund was assassinated. His successor was Eadred. The policy of the new government was supported by the Queen mother, Eadgifu of Kent, by the Archbishop of Canterbury, Oda, and by the East Anglian nobles, at whose head was the powerful ealdorman Æthelstan the "Half-king". It was a policy of unification and conciliation with the Danish half of the kingdom. The goal was a firm establishment of royal authority. In ecclesiastical matters it favoured the spread of Catholic observance, the rebuilding of churches, the moral reform of the clergy and laity, and the end of the religion of the Danes in England.
Against all these reforms were the nobles of Wessex, who included most of Dunstan's own relatives, and who had an interest in maintaining established customs. For nine years Dunstan's influence was dominant, during which time he twice refused the office of bishop (that of Winchester in 951 and Crediton in 953), affirming that he would not leave the king's side so long as the king lived and needed him.

Changes in fortune

In 955, Eadred died, and the situation was at once changed. Eadwig, the elder son of Edmund, who then came to the throne, was a headstrong youth wholly devoted to the reactionary nobles. According to one legend, the feud with Dunstan began on the day of Eadwig's coronation, when he failed to attend a meeting of nobles. When Dunstan eventually found the young monarch, he was cavorting with a noblewoman named Ælfgifu and her mother, and refused to return with the bishop. Infuriated by this, Dunstan dragged Eadwig back and forced him to renounce the girl as a "strumpet". Later realising that he had provoked the king, Dunstan fled to the apparent sanctuary of his cloister, but Eadwig, incited by Ælfgifu, whom he married, followed him and plundered the monastery.

Although Dunstan managed to escape, he saw that his life was in danger. He fled England and crossed the channel to Flanders, where he found himself ignorant of the language and of the customs of the locals. The count of Flanders, Arnulf I, received him with honour and lodged him in the Abbey of Mont Blandin, near Ghent. This was one of the centres of the Benedictine revival in that country, and Dunstan was able for the first time to observe the strict observance that had seen its rebirth at Cluny at the beginning of the century. His exile was not of long duration. Before the end of 957, the Mercians and Northumbrians revolted and drove out Eadwig, choosing his brother Edgar as king of the country north of the Thames. The south remained faithful to Eadwig. At once Edgar's advisers recalled Dunstan.

Bishop and archbishop (957–978)

Bishop of Worcester and of London
On Dunstan's return, Archbishop Oda consecrated him a bishop and, on the death of Coenwald of Worcester at the end of 957, Oda appointed Dunstan to the see.

In the following year the see of London became vacant and was conferred on Dunstan, who held it simultaneously with Worcester. In October 959, Eadwig died and his brother Edgar was readily accepted as ruler of Wessex. One of Eadwig's final acts had been to appoint a successor to Archbishop Oda, who died on 2 June 958. The chosen candidate was Ælfsige of Winchester, but he died of cold in the Alps as he journeyed to Rome for the pallium. In his place Eadwig then nominated the Bishop of Wells, Byrhthelm. As soon as Edgar became king, he reversed this second choice on the ground that Byrhthelm had not been able to govern even his first diocese properly. The archbishopric was then conferred on Dunstan.

Archbishop of Canterbury

Dunstan went to Rome in 960, and received the pallium from Pope John XII. On his journey there, Dunstan's acts of charity were so lavish as to leave nothing for himself and his attendants. His steward complained, but Dunstan seems to have suggested that they trust in Jesus Christ.

On his return from Rome, Dunstan at once regained his position as virtual prime minister of the kingdom. By his advice Ælfstan was appointed to the Bishopric of London, and Oswald to that of Worcester. In 963, Æthelwold, the Abbot of Abingdon, was appointed to the See of Winchester. With their aid and with the ready support of King Edgar, Dunstan pushed forward his reforms in the English Church. The monks in his communities were taught to live in a spirit of self-sacrifice, and Dunstan actively enforced the law of celibacy whenever possible. He forbade the practices of simony (selling ecclesiastical offices for money) and ended the custom of clerics appointing relatives to offices under their jurisdiction. Monasteries were built, and in some of the great cathedrals, monks took the place of the secular canons; in the rest the canons were obliged to live according to rule. The parish priests were compelled to be qualified for their office; they were urged to teach parishioners not only the truths of the Christian faith, but also trades to improve their position. The state saw reforms as well. Good order was maintained throughout the realm and there was respect for the law. Trained bands policed the north, and a navy guarded the shores from Viking raids. There was a level of peace in the kingdom unknown in living memory.

In 973, Dunstan's statesmanship reached its zenith when he officiated at the coronation of King Edgar. Edgar was crowned at Bath in an imperial ceremony planned not as the initiation, but as the culmination of his reign (a move that must have taken a great deal of preliminary diplomacy). This service, devised by Dunstan himself and celebrated with a poem in the Anglo-Saxon Chronicle forms the basis of the present-day British coronation ceremony. There was a second symbolic coronation held later. This was an important step, as other kings of Britain came and gave their allegiance to Edgar at Chester. Six kings in Britain, including the kings of Scotland and of Strathclyde, pledged their faith that they would be the king's liege-men on sea and land.

Edgar ruled as a strong and popular king for 16 years. In 975 he was succeeded by his eldest son Edward "the Martyr". His accession was disputed by his stepmother, Ælfthryth, who wished her own son Æthelred to reign. Through the influence of Dunstan, Edward was chosen and crowned at Winchester. Edgar's death had encouraged the reactionary nobles, and at once there was a determined attack upon the monks, the protagonists of reform. Throughout Mercia they were persecuted and deprived of their possessions. Their cause, however, was supported by Æthelwine, the ealdorman of East Anglia, and the realm was in serious danger of civil war. Three meetings of the Witan were held to settle these disputes, at Kyrtlington, at Calne, and at Amesbury. At the second of them the floor of the hall where the Witan was sitting gave way, and all except Dunstan, who clung to a beam, fell into the room below; several men were killed.

Final years (978–88)
In March 978, King Edward was assassinated at Corfe Castle, possibly at the instigation of his stepmother, and Æthelred the Unready became king. His coronation on Low Sunday 31 March 978, was the last state event in which Dunstan took part. According to William of Malmsesbury, writing over a century later, when the young king took the usual oath to govern well, Dunstan addressed him in solemn warning. He criticised the violent act whereby he became king and prophesied the misfortunes that were shortly to fall on the kingdom, but Dunstan's influence at court was ended. Dunstan retired to Canterbury, to teach at the cathedral school.

Only three more public acts are known. In 980, Dunstan joined Ælfhere of Mercia in the solemn translation of the relics of King Edward, soon to be regarded as a saint, from their grave at Wareham to a shrine at Shaftesbury Abbey. In 984, in obedience to a vision of St Andrew, he persuaded King Æthelred to appoint Ælfheah as Bishop of Winchester in succession to Æthelwold. In 986, Dunstan induced the king, by a donation of 100 pounds of silver, to stop his persecution of the See of Rochester.

Dunstan's retirement at Canterbury consisted of long hours, both day and night, spent in private prayer, as well as his regular attendance at Mass and the daily office. He visited the shrines of St Augustine and St Æthelberht, and there are reports of a vision of angels who sang to him heavenly canticles. He worked to improve the spiritual and temporal well-being of his people, to build and restore churches, to establish schools, to judge suits, to defend widows and orphans, to promote peace, and to enforce respect for purity. He practised his crafts, made bells and organs and corrected the books in the cathedral library. He encouraged and protected European scholars who came to England, and was active as a teacher of boys in the cathedral school. On the vigil of Ascension Day 988, it is recorded that a vision of angels warned he would die in three days. On the feast day itself, Dunstan said Mass and preached three times to the people: at the Gospel, at the benediction, and after the Agnus Dei. In this last address, he announced his impending death and wished his congregation well. That afternoon he chose the spot for his tomb, then went to his bed. His strength failed rapidly, and on Saturday morning, 19 May, he caused the clergy to assemble. Mass was celebrated in his presence, then he received Extreme Unction and the Viaticum, and died. Dunstan's final words are reported to have been, "He hath made a remembrance of his wonderful works, being a merciful and gracious Lord: He hath given food to them that fear Him."

The English people accepted him as a saint shortly thereafter. He was formally canonised in 1029. That year at the Synod of Winchester, St Dunstan's feast was ordered to be kept solemnly throughout England.

Legacy
Until Thomas Becket's fame overshadowed Dunstan's, he was the favourite saint of the English people. Dunstan had been buried in his cathedral. In 1880 his relics were translated to a tomb on the south side of the high altar, when that building was restored after being partially destroyed by a fire in 1174.

The monks of Glastonbury used to claim that during the sack of Canterbury by the Danes in 1012, Dunstan's body had been carried for safety to their abbey. This story was disproved by Archbishop William Warham, who opened the tomb at Canterbury in 1508. They found Dunstan's relics still to be there. Within a century, however, his shrine was destroyed during the English Reformation.

Patronage and feast day
Dunstan became patron saint of English goldsmiths and silversmiths because he worked as a silversmith making church plate. The Eastern Orthodox Church and the Roman Catholic Church mark his feast day on 19 May. Dunstan is also honoured in the Church of England and in the Episcopal Church on 19 May.

In literature and folklore
English literature contains many references to him: for example, in A Christmas Carol by Charles Dickens, and in this folk rhyme: 
St Dunstan, as the story goes,
Once pull'd the devil by the nose
With red-hot tongs, which made him roar,
That he was heard three miles or more.

This folk story is already shown in an initial in the Life of Dunstan in the Canterbury Passionale, from the second quarter of the 12th century (British Library, Harley MS 315, f. 15v.).

Daniel Anlezark has tentatively suggested that Dunstan may be the medieval author of the poem Solomon and Saturn, citing the style, word choice, and Hiberno-Latin used in the texts. However, Clive Tolley examines this claim from a linguistic point-of-view and disagrees with Anlezark's claim.

Another story relates how Dunstan nailed a horseshoe to the Devil's foot when he was asked to re-shoe the Devil's cloven hoof. This caused the Devil great pain, and Dunstan only agreed to remove the shoe and release the Devil after he promised never to enter a place where a horseshoe is over the door. This is claimed as the origin of the lucky horseshoe.

A further legend relating to Dunstan and the Devil seeks to explain the phenomena of Franklin nights, late frosts which occur around his Feast Day. The story goes that Dunstan was a great brewer and negotiated an agreement whereby the Devil could blast the blossom of local apple trees with frost, damaging the cider crop so that the saint's own beer would sell more readily.

An East London saint
As Bishop of London, Dunstan was also Lord of the Manor of Stepney, and may, like subsequent bishops, have lived there. Dunstan is recorded as having founded (or rebuilt) Stepney's church, in 952 AD. This church was dedicated to All Saints, but was rededicated to Dunstan after his canonisation in 1029, making Dunstan the Patron Saint of Stepney.

References

Notes

Citations

Sources

Further reading

Primary sources

'Author B', Vita S. Dunstani, ed. W. Stubbs, Memorials of St Dunstan, Archbishop of Canterbury. Rolls Series. London, 1874. 3–52. Portions of the text are translated by Dorothy Whitelock in English Historical Documents c. 500–1042. 2nd ed. London, 1979. These have been superseded by the new edition and translation by Michael Lapidge and Michael Winterbottom, The Early Lives of St Dunstan, Oxford University Press, 2012.
Adelard of Ghent, Epistola Adelardi ad Elfegum Archiepiscopum de Vita Sancti Dunstani, Adelard's letter to Archbishop Ælfheah of Canterbury (1005–1012) on the Life of St Dunstan, ed. W. Stubbs, Memorials of St Dunstan, Archbishop of Canterbury. Rolls Series 63. London, 1874. 53–68. Also in the new edition and translation by Michael Lapidge and Michael Winterbottom, The Early Lives of St Dunstan, Oxford University Press, 2012.
Wulfstan of Winchester, The Life of St Æthelwold, ed. and tr. M. Lapidge and M. Winterbottom, Wulfstan of Winchester. The Life of St Æthelwold. Oxford Medieval Texts. Oxford, 1991.
Reliquiae Dunstanianae, ed. W. Stubbs, Memorials of St Dunstan, Archbishop of Canterbury. Rolls Series. London, 1874. 354–439.
Fragmenta ritualia de Dunstano, ed. W. Stubbs, Memorials of St Dunstan, Archbishop of Canterbury. Rolls Series. London, 1874. 440–57.
Osbern of Canterbury, Vita sancti Dunstani and Liber Miraculorum Sancti Dunstani, ed. W. Stubbs, Memorials of St Dunstan, Archbishop of Canterbury. Rolls Series. London, 1874. 69–161.
Eadmer, Vita S. Dunstani and Miracula S. Dunstani, ed. and tr. Bernard J. Muir and Andrew J. Turner, Eadmer of Canterbury. Lives and Miracles of Saints Oda, Dunstan, and Oswald. OMT. Oxford, 2006. 41–159 and 160–212; ed. W. Stubbs, Memorials of St Dunstan, archbishop of Canterbury. Rolls Series 63. London, 1874. 162–249, 412–25.
An Old English Account of the King Edgar's Establishment of the Monasteries, tr. D. Whitelock, English Historical Documents I. Oxford University Press, 1979.

Secondary sources

Dales, Douglas, Dunstan: Saint and Statesman, Cambridge: Lutterworth Press, 1988/2013.
Duckett, Eleanor. Saint Dunstan of Canterbury (1955).
Dunstan, St. Encyclopedia of World Biography, 2nd ed. 17 vols. Gale Research, 1998.
Knowles, David. The Monastic Orders in England (1940; 2d ed. 1963).
Ramsay, Nigel St Dunstan: his Life, Times, and Cult, Woodbridge, Suffolk, UK; Rochester, NY: Boydell Press, 1992.
Sayles, G. O., The Medieval Foundations of England (1948; 2d ed. 1950).
William of Malmesbury, Vita sancti Dunstani, ed. and tr. Bernard J. Muir and Andrew J. Turner, William of Malmesbury. Lives of SS. Wulfstan, Dunstan, Patrick, Benignus and Indract. Oxford Medieval Texts. Oxford, 2002; ed. W. Stubbs, Memorials of St Dunstan, Archbishop of Canterbury. Rolls Series. London, 1874. 250–324.
John Capgrave, Vita sancti Dunstani, ed. W. Stubbs, Memorials of St Dunstan, Archbishop of Canterbury. Rolls Series. London, 1874. 325–53.

External links

 
The True Legend of St. Dunstan and the Devil by Edward G. Flight, illustrated by George Cruikshank, published in 1871, and available from Project Gutenberg
Dunstan at the British Library, BL medieval manuscripts blogpost, May 2016

900s births
988 deaths
10th-century English archbishops
10th-century artists
10th-century Christian saints
10th-century English bishops
Abbots of Glastonbury
Angelic visionaries

Anglican saints

Anglo-Saxon artists

Anglo-Saxon Benedictines

Anglo-Saxon saints

Archbishops of Canterbury

Bishops of London
Bishops of Worcester
English blacksmiths
English folklore
Manuscript illuminators
Medieval European scribes
People from Mendip District
Year of birth uncertain